In classical mythology, the Cap of Invisibility (Ἅϊδος κυνέη (H)aïdos kyneē in Greek, lit. dog-skin of Hades) is a helmet or cap that can turn the wearer invisible, also known as the Cap of Hades or Helm of Hades. Wearers of the cap in Greek myths include Athena, the goddess of wisdom, the messenger god Hermes, and the hero Perseus. Those wearing the Cap become invisible to other supernatural entities, akin to a cloud of mist sometimes used to remain undetectable.

Origins 
One ancient source that attributes a special helmet to the ruler of the underworld is the Bibliotheca (2nd/1st century BC), in which the Uranian Cyclops give Zeus the lightning bolt, Poseidon the trident, and a helmet (kyneê) to Hades (or Pluto) in their war against the Titans.

In classical mythology the helmet is regularly said to belong to the god of the underworld. Rabelais calls it the Helmet of Pluto, and Erasmus the Helmet of Orcus. The helmet becomes proverbial for those who conceal their true nature by a cunning device: "the helmet of Pluto, which maketh the politic man go invisible, is secrecy in the counsel, and celerity in the execution."

Users

Hades
As the name implies, Hades owned the helmet. It was forged for him by Elder Cyclopses after he and his brothers Zeus and Poseidon freed them from Tartarus. He then used this helmet to great effect during the Titanomachy and was instrumental in routing the Titans.

Athena
Athena, the goddess of wisdom, battle, and handicrafts, wore the Cap of Invisibility in one instance during the Trojan War. She used it to become invisible to Ares when she aided Diomedes, his enemy.  Her assistance even enabled Diomedes to injure the god of war with a spear.

Hermes
The messenger god Hermes wore the Cap during his battle with Hippolytus, the giant.

Perseus
In some stories, Perseus received the Cap of Invisibility (along with the Winged Sandals) from Athena when he went to slay the Gorgon Medusa, which helped him escape her sisters. In other myths, however, Perseus obtained these items from the Stygian nymphs. The Cap of Invisibility was not used to avoid the Gorgons' petrifying gazes, but rather to escape from the immortal Stheno and Euryale later on after he had decapitated Medusa.

In popular culture
In the Percy Jackson & the Olympians series by Rick Riordan, Annabeth Chase (a daughter of Athena) received a New York Yankees baseball cap from her mother that was a disguised cap of invisibility. In the same series, the main antagonist, Luke Castellan, stole Hades' Helm of Darkness, as well as Zeus' master bolt. Hades has also used it in The Blood of Olympus, where he goes banishing Gaea and Tartarus's children, the giants, to Tartarus.

The helmet also appears in the Italian mythological comedy Arrivano i titani, but its invisibility powers work in this version only at night.

The helm plays a major role in Dan Simmons' novel Ilium in which the scholic narrator Thomas Hockenberry acquires the artifact through Aphrodite in her scheme to have the scholic spy on and eventually assassinate the goddess Athena.

See also
 Bident  – another mystical object associated with Hades
 Cloak of invisibility
 Cloaking device
 Mambrino – a fictional Moorish king who possessed a golden helmet that would make the wearer invulnerable
 Ring of Gyges
 Tarnhelm

References

Mythological clothing
Fiction about invisibility
Invisibility
Symbols of Hades
Athena
Magic items
Ancient helmets
Deeds of Hermes